Michael Davenport may refer to:
 Mike Davenport (born 1968), American musician and convicted fraudster.